Ghasiram Sandil was an Indian politician. He was a Member of Parliament, representing Odisha in the Rajya Sabha, the upper house of India's Parliament.

References

Rajya Sabha members from Odisha
Possibly living people
Year of birth missing